The yangban were part of the traditional ruling class or gentry of dynastic Korea during the Joseon Dynasty. The yangban were mainly composed of highly educated civil servants and military officers—landed or unlanded aristocrats who individually exemplified the Korean Confucian form of a "scholarly official". They were largely government administrators and bureaucrats who oversaw medieval and early modern Korea's traditional agrarian bureaucracy until the end of the dynasty in 1897. In a broader sense, an office holder's family and descendants, as well as country families who claimed such descent, were socially accepted as yangban.

Overview
Unlike noble titles in the European and Japanese aristocracies, which were conferred on a hereditary basis, the bureaucratic position of yangban was granted by law to yangban who meritoriously passed state-sponsored civil service exams called gwageo. This exam was modeled on the imperial examinations first started during the Goryeo dynasty of Korea. Upon passing these exams—which tested knowledge of the Confucian classics and history with poetry—several times, yangban was usually assigned to a government post. It was superficially decided that a yangban family that did not produce a government official for more than three generations could lose its status and become commoners. This superficial rule was never actually applied, but was a motivation rule for yangban to study harder. In theory, a member of any social class except indentured servants, baekjeongs (Korean untouchables), and children of concubines could take the government exams and become a yangban. In reality, only the upper classes—i.e., the children of yangban—possessed the financial resources and the wherewithal to pass the exams, for which years of studying were required. These barriers and financial constraints effectively excluded most non-yangban families and the lower classes from competing for yangban status, just like scholar-officials in China.

Yangban status on a provincial level was de facto hereditary. It was customary to include all descendants of the office holders in the hyangan, a document that listed the names and lineages of local yangban families. The hyangan was maintained on blood basis, and one could be cut off from it if members of the family married social inferiors, such as tradesmen. Although the hyangan was not legally supported by government acts or statutes, the families listed in it were socially respected as yangban. Their householders had the customary right to participate in the hyangso, a local council from which they could exercise influence on local politics and administration. By reserving and demanding socio-political power through local instruments such as hyangan and hyangso, yangban automatically passed down their status to posterity in local magnate families, with or without holding central offices. These provincial families of gentility were often termed jaejisajok, which means "the country families". Thus, while legally, yangban meant high-ranking officials, in reality it included almost all descendants of the former and increasingly lost its legal exactitude.

 
Throughout Joseon history, the monarchy and the yangban existed on the slave labor of the lower classes, particularly the sangmin, whose bondage to the land as indentured servants enabled the upper classes to enjoy a perpetual life of leisure—i.e., the life of "scholarly" gentlemen. These practices effectively ended in 1894 during the Korean Empire of Gwangmu Reform. 

In today's Korea, the yangban legacy of patronage based on common educational experiences, teachers, family backgrounds, and hometowns continues in some forms, officially and unofficially. In South Korea, the practice exists among the upper class and power elite, where patronage among the conglomerates tends to predictably follow blood, school, and hometown ties. In North Korea, a de facto yangban class exists that is based mostly on military and party alliances.

Etymology
Yangban literally means "two branches" of administration: munban which comprises civil administrators and muban which comprises martial office holders. The term yangban first appeared sometime during late Goryeo but gained wider usage during the Joseon Dynasty. However, from the sixteenth century onward yangban increasingly came to denote local wealthy families who were mostly believed to be the descendants of once high-ranking officials. As more of the population aspired to become yangban and gradually succeeded in doing so in the late Joseon period by purchasing the yangban status, the privileges and splendor the term had inspired slowly vanished. It even gained a diminutive connotation.

History 
Yangban were the Joseon Dynasty equivalent of the former Goryeo nobles who had been educated in Buddhist and Confucian studies. With the succession of the Yi generals in the Joseon dynasty, prior feuds and factions were quelled through a decisive attempt to instill administrative organization throughout Korea and create a new class of agrarian bureaucrats. The individual yangban included members of this new class of bureaucrats and former Goryeo nobility. While ostensibly open to all, the "civil service exams" catered to the lifestyle and habits of the yangban, which created a semi-hereditary meritocracy, as yangban families overwhelmingly possessed the minimum education, uninterrupted study time and immense financial resources to pass such exams. The yangban, like the Mandarins before them, dominated the Royal Court and military of pre-Modern Korea and often were exempt from laws including those relating to taxes.

There were at most 100 positions open with thousands of candidates taking the exams. Competition that was originally supposed to bring out the best in each candidate gave way to the importance of familial relationships. Because the Joseon Court was constantly divided among the Northern, Southern, Eastern, and Western faction members (the eccentric geographical naming derived from the location of each leader's house in Seoul which were divided into subsections), a divided system resulted where corruption was very difficult. With each faction constantly probing for an excuse to kill off the other, if one faction was proven to be corrupt then the other factions would immediately jump on the chance to purge them. The attempt to receive or give bribes on a massive scale was suicide. It wasn't until the reign of King Sunjo that the Kim clan of Andong in cooperation with few other blood related grandee clans obtained full control over the court — after purging their rival factions and other rival clans in their own political faction the Joseon bureaucracy degenerated into corruption. At this level the exceptionally powerful families could be more properly referred to as sedoga instead of mere yangban, which by then came to include shades of classes other than the grandees.

From the sixteenth century and increasingly during the seventeenth and eighteenth centuries, high-ranking offices were monopolized by a few grandee families based in Seoul or the Han River Valley, therefore blocking any chance of gaining high-ranking posts by many provincial families of pedigree. However, provincial magnates began to refer themselves as yangban whether they held government offices or not. As more families claimed to be yangban and exercised provincial influences through local institutions, such as local council, pedigree acknowledgment and Confucius school (seowon), the term lost its original meaning and became a sort of social status that had a confusing legal standing. Its economic and cultural domain was clear, though. A landlord who studied classics at seowon could be easily looked upon as yangban by the local populace. People could now purchase yangban status by paying to procure lower government posts or jokbo, the noble pedigree.

Nearly all yangban of upper-high ranking grandee to lower-ranking provincial landlord status  suddenly lost their ancient political, social and economic power during the twentieth century. The legality of yangban was abolished in 1894. Subsequently their political and administrative role was replaced by Japanese colonial government and its administrators, although some yangban maintained their wealth and power by cooperating with the Japanese. However, the erosion of an idea of complete and exclusive power was irreversible. Many yangban families lost their estates as land became a marketable commodity. This economic debasement gained a tremendous force during the Korean War when land ownership was disturbed in an unprecedented scale. When South Korea began its new government after the war, yangban were mostly extinct and powerless, which is one reason the South Korean government was relatively free from landed interests. President Syngman Rhee had "rehired" the yangban to hold positions in the new government during the late 1940s. He made this decision to bring them back to start the government off on a good footing, by using those who were already familiar with lawmaking and administration. However, his effort came to none when the war broke out in 1950. After this decade the country was to be dominated by the military and industrial magnates.

In modern-day Korea, the yangban as a social class with legal status and landed wealth no longer exists either in the north or the south. Nevertheless, those who are well-connected in Korean society are sometimes said to have "yangban" connections. Though these claims may have some merit, such references are not usually intended to suggest any real yangban lineage or ancestry. (Many descendants of the yangban class live today. As the changing fortunes of that class rendered many individuals of "former" yangban status, it is not a stretch to assume that many, if not most, Koreans have at least some connection to the yangban class, if not any direct descent. In addition, the acquisition or theft of clan lineage records or jokbo during tumultuous times in Korea's history has thrown doubt on some claims of yangban descent.) Today, the yangban have been replaced by the Korean ruling class, i.e., an elite class of business and government elites, who dominate the country through their wealth, power and influence channeled through their familial and social networks. (This applies to North and South Korea, though the North's elite class is largely military-based.) The word is also used, at least in South Korea, as a common reference (sometimes with distinctly negative connotations, reflecting the negative impression the class system and its abuses left on Koreans as a whole) to an older, sometimes cantankerous/stubborn man.

List of Yangban families
Gyeongju Gim clan (Gim [Kim]): ruling clan of Silla, descendants of King Alji
Jinju Kang clan (Kang): old military clan of the Korean peninsula
Jeonju Yi clan (Yi [Lee]): ruling clan of Joseon
Wonju Won clan (Won): Yangban clan of Joseon
Andong Gim clan (Gim [Kim]): Yangban clan of Joseon
Munhwa Ryu clan (Ryu/Yu): Yangban clan of Joseon
Pungyang Jo clan (Jo): Yangban clan of Joseon
Cheongju Han clan (Han): old noble clan of the Korean peninsula
Yeonil Jeong clan (Jeong): old noble clan of Silla, Goryeo, and Joseon
Miryang Bak clan (Bak [Park]): ruling clan of Silla, descendants of Bak Hyeokgeose
Gyeongju Seok clan (Seok): ruling clan of early Silla
Changnyeong Seong Clan (Seong/ Sung): Yangban clan of Joseon
Gyeongju Yi clan (Yi [Lee])
Yeoheung Min clan (Min)
Wonju Byeon clan (Byeon)
Namyang Hong clan (Hong)
Naju Na clan (Na)
Andong Gwon clan (Gwon): Yangban clan of Joseon
Eunjin Song clan (Song): Yangban clan of Joseon
Papyeong Yun Clan (Yun): Yangban clan of Joseon

Ranks and titles

State Council of Joseon
Yeonguijeong, Chief State Councillor
Jwauijeong, Second State Councillor
Uuijeong, Third State Councillor

See also

Cheonmin
Seonbi
History of Korea
Korean Confucianism
Syngman Rhee
Park Chung-hee

References

Education in the Joseon dynasty
History of education in Korea
Korean caste system
Korean Confucianism
Korean Empire
Korean nobility
Social classes
Society of the Joseon dynasty